The Harklean version, designated by syr, is a Syriac language bible translation by Thomas of Harqel completed in 616 AD at the Enaton in Egypt.

The version is partly based on the earlier Philoxenian version, partly a new and very literal translation from the Greek New Testament.

References

External links
 The Harklean - Syriac Orthodox Resources. George Kiraz, Ph.D. 2001

Bible translations into Aramaic